Section 106 may refer to:

Section 106 of the Town and Country Planning Act 1990 (in the United Kingdom)
Section 106 of the National Historic Preservation Act of 1966 (in the United States of America)